Boat Harbour is a small beach located on the north-eastern side of the Kurnell Peninsula in Sydney, Australia.

History
The original inhabitants of the land were the Gweagal Aborigines who were a clan of the Tharawal (or Dharawal) tribe of Indigenous Australians. They are the traditional custodians of the southern geographic areas of Sydney.

The first land grant was issued in 1815.  of land on the Kurnell Peninsula which also included Boat Harbour was issued to James Birnie, a whaler and merchant. He named his land ‘Alpha Farm’ and built himself a cottage. When James Birnie was declared insane in 1828, John Connell gained possession of his property. John Connell died in 1848 leaving his estate to his grandsons.

In 1861 the property was sold to Thomas Holt who purchased the land for £3275. Holt, originally from Yorkshire, sailed into Sydney sometime in 1842. He made his fortune during the gold rushes of the early 1850s. He erected several mansions and ran his ‘Sutherland Estate’ in the English manner.

The rock platform and reef on the southern side of Boat Harbour is known as 'The Merries'. The coastline in the area is generally east-west, making it a potential hazard for northbound shipping, especially prior to the building of the Cape Baily Light. In 1895, the Aberdeen White Star Line passenger steamer Ninevah, on its way from London to Sydney, ran aground on this reef, during a fog. About a third of the ship's length was on the reef but she was refloated, without assistance, on the rising tide.  In 1898, the Moruya Steamship Company's small coastal steamer, Koonya, ran onto the rocks here at night during heavy rain and broke up. In 1905, the Bellambi Coal Company's collier Marjorie ran aground at night and was stranded on this reef, until part of her cargo was jettisoned and she was relocated. There were no deaths in these incidents.

Fishing
In late 2001 Boat Harbour became an aquatic reserve. The new reserve will place restrictions on fishing and bait collection.

Wildlife
The area contains several habitats which include platforms, crevices, rock-pools, boulders and cobbles. Some of the wildlife includes a variety of birds, such as plovers, ruddy turnstone and red-necked stint. From January to late March 2009, an American golden plover was present with a flock of Pacific golden plovers. This species is very rarely recorded in Australia.

Housing
There is no permanent housing located on or near the beach, though the site houses many temporary shacks made from corrugated iron or shipping containers.

Facilities
Boat harbour used to be the location of a 4WD park where driving on beach and sand dunes was permitted. From May 2010 access to the dunes was closed, but beach access remains.

Recreational Activities
Boat harbour is home of one of the best kitesurfing and windsurfing spot in Sydney Region. It works well in South Easterly or Southerly winds.
No entry for Boat or PWC allowed

Entry Fee
Since it is private property, there is an entry fee of $35 for a day visit and $175 annually per vehicle.

References

Kurnell Peninsula
Beaches of New South Wales